Ramme may refer to:

 Ramme (river), a river in Lower Saxony, Germany

People with the surname
 Ernest Ramme (1916–2004), United States Air Force General
 Jens Ramme (born 1963), German former footballer
 Walter Ramme (1895-date of death unknown), German freestyle swimmer who competed in the 1912 Summer Olympics
 Willy Adolf Theodor Ramme (1887–1953), German entomologist

See also
 Ramme Gaard, an organic farm and country estate, located just north of Hvitsten in Akershus municipality, on the coast of Norway